Welsh Young Liberals (Welsh: Rhyddfrydwr Ifanc Cymru) is the successor to what was previously "Myfyrwyr a Ieuenctid y Democratiaid Rhyddfrydol Cymru – Liberal Democrat Youth and Students Wales” and constitutes the youth wing of the Welsh Liberal Democrats. Its membership is open to any member of the Liberal Democrats living, working or studying in Wales provided they are under 26 years of age and/or in full/part-time education above that age.

The organisation has branches all over Wales, including affiliated branches at many Welsh universities. The Welsh Young Liberals campaign for the aims of the Welsh Liberal Democrats and has had members standing for election since the 2005 General Election and the 2007 Welsh Assembly Election. The organisation also supports and advocates youth engagement in local politics with many members both standing and being sitting councillors across Wales.

The Welsh Young Liberals are a part of the UK Federal Young Liberals. In April 2009, what was then MIDR Cymru rebranded and relaunched as IR Cymru following the re-branding of the federal organisation to Liberal Youth. IR Cymru also underwent a similar re-brand in early 2017 to match the federal re-branding of the Liberal Youth as "Young Liberals".

History
The organisation was founded in 2002 as MIDR Cymru, short for the Welsh Myfyrwyr a Ieuenctid y Democratiaid Rhyddfrydol Cymru, to be the Welsh branch of LDYS (Liberal Democrat Youth and Students Wales).

In 2008 the federal LDYS was re-branded as Liberal Youth. MIDR Cymru followed this in 2009, becoming IR Cymru / Liberal Youth Wales.

In 2016 the federal Liberal Youth was re-branded as Young Liberals and IR Cymru similarly followed suit with this in 2017, becoming Welsh Young Liberals | Rhyddfrydwyr Ifanc Cymru.

List of chairs

Internal organisation
The Welsh Young Liberals are part of the federal structure of Young Liberals and its Chair is the Welsh Convenor of that organisation. They are also  responsible for tailoring Young Liberals campaigns to match political circumstances in Wales, and for developing indigenous campaigns that reflect the status of Wales in the United Kingdom. It also serves as an advisory body to the Welsh Liberal Democrats on youth issues.

The Organisation is run by an executive committee consisting of a Chair, Vice-Chair, Communications Officer, Policy Officer, Campaigns Officer and Non-Portfolio Officer, all of whom are elected annually by all-member ballot, along with a Welsh Language Coordinator who is appointed by the Executive. The group also has a number of committees including an NUS Committee, a Policy & Conference Committee and a Campaigns Committee.

Current Executive Committee

Executive elections were last held in October 2022.

Branches
As of March 2017, RhI Cymru has branches in Brecon and Radnorshire, Bangor, Cardiff, Ceredigion and Swansea.

RhI Cymru is also represented by societies at Aberystwyth University, Cardiff University, Bangor University and Swansea University.

Within the Welsh Liberal Democrats
The Welsh Young Liberals are a Specified Associated Organisation (SAO) of the Welsh Liberal Democrats, with two seats on the Welsh Liberal Democrat National Executive Committee and one seat on each of the Party's other Standing Committees (Policy, Campaigns & Candidates and Conference Committees).

Campaigns

RhI  Cymru supports all the main campaigns from federal Young Liberals as well as developing and undertaking campaigns of their own. These campaigns are based on the motions submitted and passed at Conference and focus on issues facing young people today. These include running a campaign during Freshers' Fairs at universities, to attract new members and raise awareness of certain issues. Examples of major campaigns led by the organisation include a joint campaign with the Welsh Liberal Democrats to support the creative industries in Wales following the COVID-19 pandemic.

Members of RhI Cymru also stand in local elections which has seen the group experience successes, especially in the 2012 local elections where RhI Cymru candidates won in Bangor. The organisation also is sponsoring and supporting a large number of candidates for the upcoming local elections in 2017 with many RhI Cymru members standing in Cardiff, Swansea, Ceredigion and Brecon and Radnorshire.

Policy

RhI Cymru also has the ability to propose motions to the Welsh Party Conference and has had many successes in this capacity. At the Wrexham conference in Spring 2006 RhI Cymru (as MIDR Cymru) successfully proposed a motion against Nuclear power, and a second motion supporting micro-generation schemes. At the Aberystwyth conference in Autumn 2006, they successfully amended a motion on housing to reflect the particular difficulties faced by young people.

In Spring 2009, the re-branded IR Cymru put forward a successful motion which called for the Welsh Assembly to provide better compulsory education for teenagers on social and sex issues, and was partly aimed at tackling homophobic bullying.

In Spring 2013 the Welsh Liberal Democrats Party conference accepted motions on Subsidised Transport for Young People and Political Education within the Welsh Curriculum, proposed by the IR Cymru Executive Committee for 2013.

In the subsequent Spring conference in 2014, IR Cymru successfully proposed and passed a motion calling for more investment into Mental Health provision in Wales.

Both Autumn Conference 2015 and Spring conference 2016 saw the Executive bring forth and successfully pass a motion calling for improved and increased sexual education in schools. This policy was announced as having been adopted by the Lib Dem Education Minister, Kirsty Williams, in March 2017.

At Autumn Conference 2016 a motion in regards to Health Waiting Times and Mental Health services across Northern and Rural Wales was passed almost unanimously was passed, the motion having been written by an IR Cymru member.

In Autumn 2018, Welsh Young Liberals brought a motion calling for the introduction of gender-neutral school uniforms, with the aim of making them more accessible and inclusive for trans and non-binary young people. This became Welsh Government policy in 2019, when Kirsty Williams introduced new statutory guidance for schools.

See also
Young Liberals
English Young Liberals
Scottish Young Liberals
Welsh Liberal Democrats

References

External links
Welsh Young Liberals | Rhyddfrydwyr Ifanc Cymru website
Young Liberals website

Organisation of the Liberal Democrats (UK)
Welsh Liberal Democrats
Welsh Young Liberals